The men's standing long jump was a track and field athletics event held as part of the athletics at the 1904 Summer Olympics programme. It was the second time the event was held. The competition was held on Monday, August 29, 1904. Four athletes, all from the United States, competed. Ray Ewry continued his dominance of the standing jumps at the Olympics, successfully defending his championships in this one as well as the other two. He also set a new world record. Charles King took silver, with John Biller receiving bronze.

Background

This was the second appearance of the event, which was held four times from 1900 to 1912. American Ray Ewry returned as the defending Olympic champion and world record holder; he was heavily favored in this as well as all the standing jumps.

Competition format

There was a single round of jumping. Jumpers each had four jumps.

Records

These were the standing world and Olympic records (in metres) prior to the 1904 Summer Olympics.

Ray Ewry set a new world record with 3.47 metres.

Schedule

Results

References

Sources
 sports-reference.com
 

Athletics at the 1904 Summer Olympics
Long jump at the Olympics